As of Unicode version 15.0, there are 149,186 characters with code points, covering 161 modern and historical scripts, as well as multiple symbol sets. This article includes the 1062 characters in the Multilingual European Character Set 2 (MES-2) subset, and some additional related characters.

Character reference overview

HTML and XML provide ways to reference Unicode characters when the characters themselves either cannot or should not be used. A numeric character reference refers to a character by its Universal Character Set/Unicode code point, and a character entity reference refers to a character by a predefined name.

A numeric character reference uses the format

&#nnnn;
or
&#xhhhh;

where nnnn is the code point in decimal form, and hhhh is the code point in hexadecimal form. The x must be lowercase in XML documents. The nnnn or hhhh may be any number of digits and may include leading zeros. The hhhh may mix uppercase and lowercase, though uppercase is the usual style.

In contrast, a character entity reference refers to a character by the name of an entity which has the desired character as its replacement text. The entity must either be predefined (built into the markup language) or explicitly declared in a Document Type Definition (DTD). The format is the same as for any entity reference:

&name;

where name is the case-sensitive name of the entity. The semicolon is required.

Because numbers are harder for humans to remember than names, character entity references are most often written by humans, while numeric character references are most often produced by computer programs.

Control codes

65 characters, including DEL. All belong to the common script.

Footnotes:
1 Control-C has typically been used as a "break" or "interrupt" key.
2 Control-D has been used to signal "end of file" for text typed in at the terminal on Unix / Linux systems. Windows, DOS, and older minicomputers used Control-Z for this purpose.
3 Control-G is an artifact of the days when teletypes were in use. Important messages could be signalled by striking the bell on the teletype. This was carried over on PCs by generating a buzz sound.
4 Line feed is used for "end of line" in text files on Unix / Linux systems.
5 Carriage Return (accompanied by line feed) is used as "end of line" character by Windows, DOS, and most minicomputers other than Unix- / Linux-based systems
6 Control-O has been the "discard output" key. Output is not sent to the terminal, but discarded, until another Control-o is typed.
7 Control-Q has been used to tell a host computer to resume sending output after it was stopped by Control-S.
8 Control-S has been used to tell a host computer to postpone sending output to the terminal. Output is suspended until restarted by the Control-Q key. 
9 Control-U was originally used by Digital Equipment Corporation computers to cancel the current line of typed-in text. Other manufacturers used Control-X for this purpose.
10 Control-X was commonly used to cancel a line of input typed in at the terminal.
11 Control-Z has commonly been used on minicomputers, Windows and DOS systems to indicate "end of file" either on a terminal or in a text file. Unix / Linux systems use Control-D to indicate end-of-file at a terminal.

Latin script

The Unicode Standard (version 15.0) classifies 1,481 characters as belonging to the Latin script.

Basic Latin

95 characters; the 52 alphabet characters belong to the Latin script. The remaining 43 belong to the common script.
The 33 characters classified as ASCII Punctuation & Symbols are also sometimes referred to as ASCII special characters. Often only these characters (and not other Unicode punctuation) are what is meant when an organization says a password "requires punctuation marks".

Latin-1 Supplement

96 characters; the 62 letters, and two ordinal indicators belong to the Latin script. The remaining 32 belong to the common script.

Latin Extended-A

128 characters; all belong to the Latin script.

Latin Extended-B

208 characters; all belong to the Latin script; 33 in the MES-2 subset.

Latin Extended Additional

256 characters; all belong to the Latin script; 23 in the MES-2 subset.

Additional Latin Extended
 Latin Extended-C (Unicode block)
 Latin Extended-D (Unicode block)
 Latin Extended-E (Unicode block)
 Latin Extended-F (Unicode block)
 Latin Extended-G (Unicode block)

Phonetic scripts

IPA Extensions

96 characters; all belong to the Latin script; three in the MES-2 subset.

Spacing modifier letters

80 characters; 15 in the MES-2 subset.

Phonetic Extensions
 Phonetic Extensions (Unicode block)
 Phonetic Extensions Supplement (Unicode block)

Combining Marks

Greek and Coptic

144 code points; 135 assigned characters; 85 in the MES-2 subset.

Greek Extended

For polytonic orthography. 256 code points; 233 assigned characters, all in the MES-2 subset (#670 – 902).

Cyrillic

256 characters; 191 in the MES-2 subset.

Cyrillic supplements
 Cyrillic Supplement (Unicode block)
 Cyrillic Extended-A (Unicode block)
 Cyrillic Extended-B (Unicode block)
 Cyrillic Extended-C (Unicode block)
 Cyrillic Extended-D (Unicode block)

Armenian

Semitic languages

Arabic

Hebrew

Syriac

Mandaic
 Mandaic (Unicode block)

Samaritan
 Samaritan (Unicode block)

Thaana

Brahmic (Indic) scripts

The range from U+0900 to U+0DFF includes Devanagari, Bengali script, Gurmukhi, Gujarati script, Odia alphabet, Tamil script, Telugu script, Kannada script, Malayalam script, and Sinhala script.

Devanagari

Bengali and Assamese

Gurmukhi

Gujarati

Oriya

Tamil

Telugu

Kannada

Malayalam

Sinhala

Other Brahmic scripts
Other Brahmic and Indic scripts in Unicode include:

 Ahom (Unicode block)
 Balinese (Unicode block)
 Batak (Unicode block)
 Bhaiksuki (Unicode block)
 Buhid (Unicode block)
 Buginese (Unicode block)
 Chakma (Unicode block)
 Cham (Unicode block)
 Common Indic Number Forms (Unicode block)
 Dives Akuru (Unicode block)
 Dogra (Unicode block)
 Grantha (Unicode block)
 Hanunoo (Unicode block)
 Javanese (Unicode block)
 Kaithi (Unicode block)
 Kawi (Unicode block)
 Khmer (Unicode block)
 Khmer Symbols (Unicode block)
 Khojki (Unicode block)
 Khudawadi (Unicode block)
 Lao (Unicode block)
 Lepcha (Unicode block)
 Limbu (Unicode block)
 Mahajani (Unicode block)
 Makasar (Unicode block)
 Marchen (Unicode block)
 Meetei Mayek (Unicode block)
 Meetei Mayek Extensions (Unicode block)
 Modi (Unicode block)
 Multani (Unicode block)
 Myanmar (Unicode block)
 Myanmar Extended-A (Unicode block)
 Myanmar Extended-B (Unicode block)
 New Tai Lue (Unicode block)
 Newa (Unicode block)
 Phags-pa (Unicode block)
 Rejang (Unicode block)
 Saurashtra (Unicode block)
 Sharada (Unicode block)
 Siddham (Unicode block)
 Sundanese (Unicode block)
 Sundanese Supplement (Unicode block)
 Syloti Nagri (Unicode block)
 Tagalog (Unicode block)
 Tagbanwa (Unicode block)
 Tai Le (Unicode block)
 Tai Tham (Unicode block)
 Tai Viet (Unicode block)
 Takri (Unicode block)
 Thai (Unicode block)
 Tibetan (Unicode block)
 Tirhuta (Unicode block)

Other South and Central Asian writing systems 
 Gunjala Gondi (Unicode block)
 Masaram Gondi (Unicode block)
 Mro (Unicode block)
 Nag Mundari (Unicode block)
 Ol Chiki (Unicode block)
 Sora Sompeng (Unicode block)
 Tangsa (Unicode block)
 Toto (Unicode block)
 Warang Citi (Unicode block)

Southeast Asian writing systems
 Hanifi Rohingya (Unicode block)
 Kayah Li (Unicode block)
 Pahawh Hmong (Unicode block)
 Pau Cin Hau (Unicode block)

Georgian

African scripts

Ge'ez/Ethiopic script

Other African scripts
 Adlam (Unicode block)
 Bamum (Unicode block)
 Bamum Supplement (Unicode block)
 Bassa Vah (Unicode block)
 Medefaidrin (Unicode block)
 Mende Kikakui (Unicode block)
 NKo (Unicode block)
 Osmanya (Unicode block)
 Ottoman Siyaq Numbers
 Tifinagh (Unicode block)
 Vai (Unicode block)

American scripts

Unified Canadian Aboriginal Syllabics

Other American scripts
 Cherokee (Unicode block)
 Cherokee Supplement (Unicode block)
 Deseret (Unicode block)
 Kaktovik Numerals (Unicode block)
 Osage (Unicode block)

Mongolian

Unicode symbols

General Punctuation

112 code points; 111 assigned characters; 24 in the MES-2 subset.

Superscripts and Subscripts

Currency Symbols

Letterlike Symbols

Number Forms

Arrows

 Miscellaneous Symbols and Arrows (Unicode block)
 Supplemental Arrows-A (Unicode block)
 Supplemental Arrows-B (Unicode block)
 Supplemental Arrows-C (Unicode block)

Mathematical symbols

 Supplemental Mathematical Operators (Unicode block)
 Miscellaneous Mathematical Symbols-A (Unicode block)
 Miscellaneous Mathematical Symbols-B (Unicode block)
 Mathematical Alphanumeric Symbols: Mathematical Alphanumeric Symbols (Unicode block)

Miscellaneous Technical

Control Pictures

Optical Character Recognition

Enclosed Alphanumerics

Box Drawing

Block Elements

Geometric Shapes

Miscellaneous Symbols

Symbols for Legacy Computing

Dingbats

East Asian writing systems

CJK Symbols and Punctuation

Hiragana

Katakana

 Kana Extended-A (Unicode block)
 Kana Extended-B (Unicode block)
 Kana Supplement (Unicode block)
 Katakana Phonetic Extensions (Unicode block)
 Small Kana Extension (Unicode block)

Bopomofo

Hangul Jamo and Compatibility Jamo

Kanbun

Enclosed CJK Letters and Months

CJK Compatibility

CJK Compatibility Forms

CJK Unified Ideographs
 CJK Unified Ideographs

CJK Radicals
 CJK Radicals Supplement (Unicode block)
 CJK Strokes (Unicode block)
 Kangxi Radicals (Unicode block)

Other East Asian writing systems
 Counting Rod Numerals (Unicode block)
 Halfwidth and Fullwidth Forms (Unicode block)
 Ideographic Description Characters (Unicode block)
 Khitan Small Script (Unicode block)
 Lisu (Unicode block)
 Lisu Supplement (Unicode block)
 Miao (Unicode block)
 Modifier Tone Letters (Unicode block)
 Nushu (Unicode block)
 Nyiakeng Puachue Hmong (Unicode block)
 Small Form Variants (Unicode block)
 Tai Xuan Jing Symbols (Unicode block)
 Tangut (Unicode block)
 Tangut Components (Unicode block)
 Tangut Supplement (Unicode block)
 Vertical Forms (Unicode block)
 Wancho (Unicode block)
 Yi Syllables (Unicode block)
 Yi Radicals (Unicode block)
 Yijing Hexagram Symbols (Unicode block)

Alphabetic Presentation Forms

Ancient and historic scripts

 Aegean Numbers (Unicode block)
 Anatolian Hieroglyphs (Unicode block)
 Ancient Greek Numbers (Unicode block)
 Ancient Symbols (Unicode block)
 Avestan (Unicode block)
 Brahmi (Unicode block)
 Carian (Unicode block)
 Caucasian Albanian (Unicode block)
 Chorasmian (Unicode block)
 Cuneiform (Unicode block)
 Cuneiform Numbers and Punctuation (Unicode block)
 Cypriot Syllabary (Unicode block)
 Cypro-Minoan (Unicode block)
 Early Dynastic Cuneiform (Unicode block)
 Egyptian Hieroglyph Format Controls (Unicode block)
 Egyptian Hieroglyphs (Unicode block)
 Elbasan (Unicode block)
 Elymaic (Unicode block)
 Glagolitic (Unicode block)
 Glagolitic Supplement (Unicode block)
 Gothic (Unicode block)
 Hatran (Unicode block)
 Imperial Aramaic (Unicode block)
 Indic Siyaq Numbers
 Inscriptional Pahlavi (Unicode block)
 Inscriptional Parthian (Unicode block)
 Kharoshthi (Unicode block)
 Linear A (Unicode block)
 Linear B Ideograms (Unicode block)
 Linear B Syllabary (Unicode block)
 Lycian (Unicode block)
 Lydian (Unicode block)
 Manichaean (Unicode block)
 Mayan Numerals (Unicode block)
 Meroitic Cursive (Unicode block)
 Meroitic Hieroglyphs (Unicode block)
 Nabataean (Unicode block)
 Nandinagari (Unicode block)
 Ogham (Unicode block)
 Old Hungarian (Unicode block)
 Old Italic (Unicode block)
 Old North Arabian (Unicode block)
 Old Permic (Unicode block)
 Old Persian (Unicode block)
 Old Sogdian (Unicode block)
 Old South Arabian (Unicode block)
 Old Turkic (Unicode block)
 Old Uyghur (Unicode block)
 Palmyrene (Unicode block)
 Phaistos Disc (Unicode block)
 Phoenician (Unicode block)
 Psalter Pahlavi (Unicode block)
 Runic (Unicode block)
 Sogdian (Unicode block)
 Soyombo (Unicode block)
 Ugaritic (Unicode block)
 Vithkuqi (Unicode block)
 Yezidi (Unicode block)
 Zanabazar Square (Unicode block)

Shavian

Notational systems

Braille
 Braille Patterns (Unicode block)

Music
 Western Musical Symbols (Unicode block)
 Byzantine Musical Symbols (Unicode block)
 Ancient Greek Musical Notation (Unicode block)
 Znamenny Musical Notation (Unicode block)

Shorthand
 Duployan (Unicode block)
 Shorthand Format Controls (Unicode block)

Sutton SignWriting
 Sutton SignWriting: Sutton SignWriting (Unicode block)

Emoji
 Emoji in Unicode

Alchemical symbols

Game symbols

Mahjong Tiles

Domino Tiles

Playing Cards

Chess Symbols

Special areas and format characters
 Private Use Areas
 Private Use Area (Unicode block)
 Supplementary Private Use Area-A (Unicode block)
 Supplementary Private Use Area-B (Unicode block)
 Specials (Unicode block)
 Surrogates
 Low Surrogates (Unicode block)
 High Surrogates (Unicode block)
 High Private Use Surrogates (Unicode block)
 Tags (Unicode block)
 Variation Selectors
 Variation Selectors (Unicode block)
 Variation Selectors Supplement (Unicode block)

See also
 Comparison of Unicode encodings
 Open-source Unicode typefaces
 GNU Unifont
 List of radicals in Unicode
 List of Unicode fonts
 List of typefaces
 Typographic unit
 Unicode Consortium
 Fallback font
 Unicode font
 Universal Character Set characters

References

 Unicode 7.0 Character Code Charts, Unicode, Inc.
 CWA 13873:2000 – Multilingual European Subsets in ISO/IEC 10646-1 CEN Workshop Agreement 13873
 Multilingual European Character Set 2 (MES-2) Rationale, Markus Kuhn, 1998

External links

 Official web site of the Unicode Consortium (English)

Characters
Lists of symbols